George Plantagenet may refer to:

 George Plantagenet, Duke of Bedford (1477-1479)
 George Plantagenet, 1st Duke of Clarence (1449-1478)